This article describes all the 2016 seasons of TCR Series around the world.

Calendar
This table indicates the race number of each TCR Series according to weekend dates.

TCR International Series

TCR Asia Series

TCR Russian Series

TCR Italian Series

TCR Portuguese Series

ADAC TCR German Series

TCR Benelux Series

TCR Spanish Series

TCR Thailand Series

TCR Trophy Europe

References

External links
 
 
 

TCR Series